Woodcote Green is an area in the London Borough of Sutton, located in the south-east of the borough south of Wallington. At the 2011 Census the population of the area was included in the Beddington South ward of Sutton Council.

References

Areas of London
Districts of the London Borough of Sutton